The Guinean Entertainment Agency (AGS) was a government entertainment agency in Guinea.It was established in May 1973 to replace the former Syliart. It was run by the Ministry of Youth, Arts and Sports and supported artists and playwrights in Guinea as well as providing a pension to those who works were in accordance with the Democratic Party of Guinea.

References

Government of Guinea
Mass media in Guinea
Organisations based in Guinea